Chatham is a village in Sangamon County, Illinois, United States. It is located 2.8 miles south of Springfield and has a retail trade area that extends into four other municipalities, including Springfield. The population was 11,500 as of the 2010 census and estimated to be 13,008 as of 2019.  The village lies along the original alignment of historic U.S. Route 66 (Illinois Route 4).

Chatham is part of the Springfield, Illinois Metropolitan Statistical Area.

Geography
Chatham is located at  (39.672899, -89.698385).

Demographics

As of the census of 2010, the racial makeup of the village was 93.57% White, 2.47% African American, 0.09% Native American, 1.85% Asian, 0.46% from other races, and 1.57% from two or more races. Hispanic or Latino of any race were 1.97% of the population.

As of the census of 2000, there were 8,583 people, 3,083 households, and 2,472 families residing in the village. The racial makeup of the village was 97.48% White, 0.77% African American, 0.15% Native American, 0.90% Asian, 0.15% from other races, and 0.55% from two or more races. Hispanic or Latino of any race were 0.77% of the population.

There were 3,083 households, out of which 47.4% had children under the age of 18 living with them, 65.9% were married couples living together, 11.1% had a female householder with no husband present, and 19.8% were non-families. 16.5% of all households were made up of individuals, and 4.7% had someone living alone who was 65 years of age or older. The average household size was 2.78 and the average family size was 3.13.

In the village, the population was spread out, with 32.0% under the age of 18, 6.5% from 18 to 24, 31.7% from 25 to 44, 22.6% from 45 to 64, and 7.2% who were 65 years of age or older. The median age was 35 years. For every 100 females, there were 96.4 males. For every 100 females age 18 and over, there were 90.6 males.

The median income for a household in the village was $60,350, and the median income for a family was $64,257. Males had a median income of $45,543 versus $31,883 for females. The per capita income for the village was $23,167. About 2.8% of families and 4.7% of the population were below the poverty line, including 5.2% of those under age 18 and 5.6% of those age 65 or over.

Education
Chatham is part of the Ball-Chatham School District, which includes Glenwood High School, three elementary schools, an Intermediate School, and a middle school. Chatham was one of five area schools awarded the Bright Star Award for educational excellence at the elementary and high school level. The website for these schools can be found at Chatham Schools Website.

Festivals
Every June the Chatham American Legion Homecoming Festival takes place in the Chatham town square. Each year in July, Chatham is host to the Chatham Sweet Corn Festival and Illinois Championship Cow Chip Throw sponsored by the Chatham Jaycees. Each year in September Chatham Jaycees host the Octoberfest in the Chatham town square

Places of interest
 Chatham Railroad Museum (1902)
 Caldwell Farmstead (National Register of Historic Places)
 Interurban Trail, a mixed-use rails-to-trails trail, (Chatham and Woodside townships, . in length)
Chatham Clarion. (Local Newspaper)

Notable people
 Kenneth Boyle, Illinois state representative and lawyer
 Kelci Bryant, Olympic diver
 Gracie Gold, US and Olympic figure skater
 Phil Maton, pitcher for the Houston Astros
 Nick Maton, infielder for the Philadelphia Phillies
 Jayson Werth, outfielder for the Toronto Blue Jays, Los Angeles Dodgers, Philadelphia Phillies and Washington Nationals
 Reid Detmers, pitcher for the Los Angeles Angels

References

External links
 Village of Chatham official website
 Chatham Area Public Library District

Villages in Sangamon County, Illinois
Villages in Illinois
Springfield metropolitan area, Illinois